Omsk is the administrative center and largest city of Omsk Oblast, Russia. It is situated in southwestern Siberia and has a population of over 1.1 million. Omsk is the third largest city in Siberia after Novosibirsk and Krasnoyarsk, and the twelfth-largest city in Russia. It is an important transport node, serving as a train station for the Trans-Siberian Railway and as a staging post for the Irtysh River.

 

During the Imperial era, Omsk was the seat of the Governor General of Western Siberia and, later, of the Governor General of the Steppes. For a brief period during the Russian Civil War in 1918–1920, it served as the capital of the anti-Bolshevik Russian State and held the imperial gold reserves.

Omsk serves as the episcopal see of the bishop of Omsk and Tara, as well as the administrative seat of the Imam of Siberia. The mayor is Sergey Shelest.

Etymology
The city of Omsk is named after the Om river. This hydronym in the dialect of Baraba Tatars means "the quiet one".

History

Imperial period

The creation of the Omsk fortress, like other Upper Irtysh fortresses, was caused by the urgent need to strengthen the trade route to China. The merit for their arrangement belongs entirely to the Siberian governor, Prince M.P. Gagarin. However, he also bears a large share of the responsibility. Gagarin, being the governor in Nerchinsk and then the head of the Siberian order and the Siberian province, devoted a lot of time and effort to trade with China. And above all, he organized the trade route to this country. 

The main route passed from Tobolsk, down the Irtysh, then up the Ob, then along the Ket portage to the Yenisei, and on to the border with China. The journey was long, difficult, and expensive. There was also a second option - up the Irtysh, twice shorter and much easier. Kalmyk, Kyrgyz-Kaisak and Chinese chiefs were interested in this route as they all had their share of international trade. However, above the mouth of the Ob, trade caravans were attacked by free detachments of Kalmyks (Oirats) and Kirghiz-Kaisaks, which their rulers could not cope with. A reliable guard was needed with its placement in stationary fortifications.

In May 1714, the Siberian governor received the tsar's consent to build fortresses along the Irtysh and to the existing trade route. In his report to the tsar on May 22, 1714, Gagarin substantiated the need to build fortresses along the Irtysh to ensure communication and safety of the expedition going to the city of Yarkand for the golden sand. 

The gold deposit was behind the Tien Shan ridges, on the territory of a neighboring state, in the Taklamakan Desert. Prince Gagarin understood the consequences of this adventure. With a positive result, this would threaten a military conflict with China and Dzungaria. Of course, the Siberian governor did not expect the military expedition to reach Yarkand. It was almost impossible and unnecessary. The fortresses along the trade route would remain. The tsar believed in the governor and signed a decree organizing an expedition under the command of a former captain of the Guards, Army Lieutenant Colonel Ivan Bukholts, about the construction of fortresses along the Irtysh above Yamyshev.

on January 2, 1716, Matvey Petrovich Gagarin took up his governor's duties and actively took up the construction of fortresses in Siberia including those on Lake Kosogol, and the Yenisei and Irtysh rivers. Between January 8-10, 1716, the prince met with the king and made him an offer as a golden collection from the ancient burial mounds plundered along the Ishim and Irtysh.

At the meeting, Gagarin reported to Peter about his plans for the development of Siberia and received the tsar's permission, presumably as the highest resolution. On January 27, 1716, Peter I left for Europe, where he stayed until October 1717 and ceased receiving timely and reliable information from Siberia. In January 1716, Gagarin (regarding the tsar's decree) issued his own orders for the construction of a fortress on the frontier of Kosogol Lake and in April on the construction of the fortresses on the Upper Yenisei.

On April 28, the Buholz detachment abandoned the Yamyshev fortress and moved down the Irtysh to the territory of the Tarsky district. Gagarin assessed the situation and gave instructions to Lieutenant Colonel Buholz and the Tara commandant to build a fortress at the mouth of the Om and sent recruits to reinforce them. By the end of 1716, the first fortress (fortified place) was built in the modern river station. It comprised an earthen pentagonal fortress, powder and food stores, barracks for soldiers, and houses for officers. 

The first Omsk fortress (fortified place) was practically a copy of the fortress erected in 1715 near Yamyshevskoye Lake. However, it also carried the main drawback: the fortifications were scattered and the outer fence was weak. When the enemy attacked, the entire garrison would have to defend the fortress objects separate from each other. This actually happened in 1716 during the defense of the Yamyshevskaya fortress. The unsuccessful layout of the first Yamyshev and Omsk fortresses was explained by the lack of fortification experience among the construction managers.

At the beginning of 1717, the dragoon captain, Ilya Gavrilovich Aksakov, was requested to make the trip from Russia. The Governor conferred a major on him and directed him to supervise the construction of a new (second) fortress at the mouth of the Om.
In the summer of 1717, the Omsk garrison under the command of Stupin went to the upper Irtysh to build fortresses. Lieutenant Colonel Ivan Buholz categorically refused to lead a new expedition. In March 1717, he was sent from Tobolsk to the capital. There is very little information about the foundation of the Omsk settlement and the construction of the second fortress. One of the most valuable sources of information is the inventory of documents of the Tara Chancellery, copied for Professor G.F. Miller in 1734. This inventory was mentioned by Professor  in 1960, and in 2015 it was published by the Barnaul scientists V.B. Borodaev and A.V. Kontev. However, there are no drawings and it is not known where and how the new city (fortress) was built. From Tara to the Omsk fortress, a drawing was sent "On the structure of the Omsk fortress beyond the Omya river prison and courtyards in a line." 

In 1722, this drawing was used by the captain-engineer, Paul de Grange, in the plan's development of the fortress on the right bank of the Om. At the end of the summer of 1717, Gagarin ordered the production of six bells for the Yamyshevskaya and Omsk fortresses. Bells were made by the military department and in an amount of three pieces per fortress. According to the drawing of the Omsk fortress in 1717, there was a triangular guard redoubt at the mouth of the Om, a quadrangular fort at the crossing over the Om, and a pentagonal fortress in the yard. At the beginning of 1718, seven bells were made. Perhaps the seventh was intended for the Omsk Sloboda on the right bank of the Om. There is no information about whether the quadrangular fort and the triangular redoubt were built. However, it is known that the fortress (defensive structure) was built pentagonal, although not as regular as in the drawing. This is clear from the plans of 1745 and 1755. The entire settlement (Omsk fortress, including the Cossack settlement and the main defensive structure) had the shape of an irregular, broken quadrangle.

In 1768 Om fortress was moved. The original Tobolsk and the restored Tara gates, along with the original German Lutheran Church and several public buildings, are left. Omsk was granted town status in 1782.

In 1822, Omsk became an administrative capital of Western Siberia and later in 1882 the center of the vast Steppes region (today the northern part of Kazakhstan) and Akmolinsk Oblast acquiring several churches and cathedrals of various denominations, mosques, a synagogue, the governor-general's mansion, and a military academy. But as the frontier receded and its military importance diminished, the town fell into disarray. For that reason, Omsk became a major center of the Siberian exile. From 1850 to 1854,  Fyodor Dostoyevsky served his sentence in an Omsk katorga prison.

Inside the Omsk settlement (the city of Omsk), a military settlement - the Omsk fortress - lived on its own for approximately 150 years. By 1845, the structures of the Omsk fortress were half destroyed, which prompted the engineering department of the military department to petition for the abolition of the fortress. In 1864, the fortress was destroyed.

Development of the city was generated by the construction of the Trans-Siberian Railway in the 1890s. This move led to the significance of Omsk as a logistic hub. Many trade companies established stores and offices in Omsk which came to define the character of the city center. British, Dutch, and German consulates were established roughly at the same time to represent their commercial interests. The pinnacle of development for pre-revolutionary Omsk was the Siberian Exposition of Agriculture and Industry in 1910. Popularity of the World Fair contributed to the image of Omsk as the "Chicago of Siberia."

After the October Revolution, anti-Bolshevik White forces seized control of Omsk. The "Provisional All-Russian Government" was established in Omsk in 1918, headed by the Arctic explorer and decorated war hero Admiral Kolchak. Omsk was proclaimed the capital of Russia, and its central bank was tasked with safekeeping the former empire's gold reserves. These were guarded by a garrison of former Czechoslovakian POWs trapped in Siberia by the chaos of World War I and the subsequent Revolution. Omsk became a prime target for the Red Army, which viewed it as a major focus of their Siberian campaign and eventually forced Kolchak and his government to abandon the city and retreat along the Trans-Siberian eastward to Irkutsk. Bolshevik forces entered the city in 1919.

Soviet period

The Soviet government preferred the young Novonikolayevsk (later known as Novosibirsk) as the administrative center of Western Siberia, prompting the mass transfer of administrative, cultural, and educational functions from Omsk to Novonikolayevsk. This directive stunted Omsk's growth and sparked a continuing rivalry between the two cities. Omsk received a new life because of World War II. Because it was both far from the fighting and had a well-developed infrastructure, Omsk provided a perfect haven for much of the industry evacuated away from the frontlines. Contingency plans were made to transfer the provisional Soviet capital to Omsk in the event of a German victory during the Battle of Moscow (October 1941 to January 1942). At the end of the war, Omsk remained a major industrial center, subsequently becoming a leader in Soviet military production.

Military industries which moved to Omsk included part of the OKMO tank-design bureau in 1941, and S.M. Kirov Factory no. 185 from Chelyabinsk, in 1962. The Kirov Factory and Omsk Transmash design bureau (KBTM) produced T-80 tanks from the 1970s, and handled the BTR-T, TOS-1, and the prototype Black Eagle tank. Unfortunately, Omsk Transmash declared bankruptcy in 2002.

In the 1950s, following the development of the oil and natural-gas field in Siberia, an oil-refining complex was built, along with an entire "town of oil workers", expanding Omsk northward along the Irtysh. It is currently the largest such complex in Russia. Gazprom Neft, the parent company, is the largest employer in the city, wielding its tax rates as leverage in negotiations with municipal and regional authorities. The nearby parts of the city close to the complex were nicknamed Neftezovodskaya by local workers of the oil-refining complex.

Omsk-Severnyy (air base), a Russian Air Force base, is located nearby.

Post-Soviet period
Following the dissolution of the Soviet Union, Omsk experienced a period of economic instability and political stagnation. Most of the city's large businesses, which had been state owned, were fought over by members of the former party elite, the emerging nouveau riche, and fast growing criminal syndicates. The most notorious cases involved the privatization of Sibneft, a major oil company.  Until the end of the 1990s, political life in Omsk was defined by an ongoing feud between the oblast and city authorities. The resulting conflict developed into two points of view, which served as the impetus for some improvements to the city's infrastructure and cultural life. These improvements included the construction of new leisure parks and the renovation of the city's historic center, the establishment of the annual Siberian International Marathon, and of the annual City Days Festival. Despite this, internal political competition continued to drain the city's resources and served as a major obstacle for smooth government operations and city development.

Geography

Location
Omsk is in the south of the West Siberian Plain, along the banks of the north-flowing Irtysh, at its confluence with the Om River.

Omsk is an important railroad hub and is the junction point for the northern and southern branches of the Trans-Siberian Railway. The city also serves as a major hub for the regional highway network. River-port facilities handle both passengers and freight, giving the city access to navigating the extensive waterways of the Irtysh and Ob River. The waterways connect Omsk with the coal and mineral-mining towns further up the river in Kazakhstan, as well as with the oil, natural gas and lumber operations of northern Siberia. Omsk is served by the Tsentralny Airport, which offers access to domestic and international (primarily, German and Kazakh) destinations, making the city an important aviation hub for Siberia and the Russian Far East.

Climate
Omsk has a humid continental climate (Köppen Dfb) characterized by dramatic seasonal shifts in weather: winters are long, dry, windy and very cold, and summers are short but sunny and warm, sometimes hot. On average, Omsk sees over 300 sunny days a year (2201 hours).

Administrative and municipal status
Within the framework of administrative divisions, it is incorporated as the city of oblast significance of Omsk—an administrative unit with the status equal to that of the districts. As a municipal division, the city of oblast significance of Omsk is incorporated as Omsk Urban Okrug.

Demographics
The population in Omsk had been steadily rising, according to the records: from 31,000 in 1881 to 53,050 in 1900 and to 1,148,418 in 1989. The 2002 Census recorded that the population had declined to 1,134,016, but it rebounded marginally, according to the 2010 Census, which listed the population of 1,154,116.

Architecture

The architectural centerpiece of the city is an ensemble of buildings along Lyubinsky Avenue/Lenina Street, anchored by the former Gostiny Dvor, and flanked by two chapels. The area is an eclectic mix of architectural styles, dominated by Art nouveau, Neoclassical and Second Empire.

Closer to the confluence of the Om and the Irtysh are the few surviving sombre buildings of the 18th-century fortress. The largest and most opulent church in the city is the Dormition Cathedral, a five-domed edifice in the Russian Revival style, consecrated in 1896, demolished by the Soviets, and restored in the first decade of the 21st century. 

Another area of interest is Nikolsky Avenue-Krasnykh Zor Street, where a line of merchants' wooden houses still stands. The street leads to the Neoclassical cathedral of St. Nicholas, which was commissioned by the Cossacks, designed by Vasily Stasov and consecrated in 1840. It contains various relics of the Siberian Cossacks.

Also, an important sigh-seen of the city is the Achair Women's Monastery in the name of the Life-giving Cross of the Lord. It is known for a spring with healing mineral water (+37 degrees) on its territory, which was consecrated on September 14, 1993, by Patriarch Alexy II of Moscow.

Life and culture
As a prominent educational center, Omsk has several museums, theaters, music venues, and educational institutions.

Among Omsk's museums, the most notable are:
 The State Museum of Regional History
 The Dostoyevsky Museum of Literature
 The Vrubel Museum of Fine Arts
 The Military Museum Complex
 The Kondraty Belov Art Museum
 The Liberov Center for Art

Theaters include the Omsk Opera, The Omsk Theater of Drama, The Omsk Circus, Omsk State Music Theater, and several smaller venues.

Education

Omsk is home to many institutions of higher learning and several universities:
 Law and Economics Institute
 Omsk Academy of Law
 Omsk Academy of MVD Rossija
 Omsk Aviation Technical School
 Omsk Foreign Language Institute
 Omsk State Medical University
 Omsk State Transport University (1961)
 Omsk State Agrarian University (1918) (connected with Omsk State Veterinary Institute and Institute of Agribusiness and Continuing Education)
 Omsk State Pedagogical University
 Omsk State University (1974)
 Omsk Institute of Consumer Service Technology
 Omsk State Technical University (1942)
 SibADI - Siberian State Automobile and Highway Academy (formerly, Institute)
 SibGUFK - Siberian Academy of Physical Culture
 Siberian Institute of Business and Information Technology
 Sovremennyi Gomunitarnyi University
 SIBNFOR - Siberian Stock Market Institute

Sports

Omsk is represented nationally by professional association football and hockey clubs.

Transportation

Omsk is a major rail, road, and air hub. The city is served by a station on the Trans-Siberian Railway, and by the Tsentralny Airport.  Omsk possesses a river port on the Irtysh, offering service to domestic destinations and to cities within Kazakhstan. Omsk is in European route E30 (in Russia R254 highway) that provides access to all of Europe.

Municipal public transportation comprises a large bus and trolley, and tram networks, although the latter has deteriorated severely since the collapse of the USSR. Marshrutkas (shared taxis) supplement municipal transit networks.

A Metro system, proposed in the late 1980s, but postponed for lack of funds, is currently under construction, with the Metro bridge over the Irtysh River. The bridge is already opened for cars (upper level), but the metro (lower level) is still under construction. As a first step, one short line will connect the districts in the northwest with the city center. As of 2017, only one station is open and serves as a pedestrian subway.

Honors
 The 3406 Omsk asteroid, which lies in the main asteroid belt, is named after the city.

Notable people

 Innokenty Annensky, poet
 Nina Arkhipova, actress
 Vladislav Artemiev, chess player
 Fyodor Dostoyevsky, writer and essayist, in exile 1849–1854
 Vladislav Dvorzhetsky, actor
 Wacław Iwaszkiewicz-Rudoszański, Polish general
 Eduard Kunz, pianist
 Dmitry Yazov, Russian general
 Dmitry Karbyshev, general
 Vilis Krištopans, former Prime Minister of Latvia
 Valerian Kuybyshev, revolutionary
 Sergey Letov, jazz musician
 Yegor Letov, rock musician
 Vladimir Lukin, politician
 Leonid Martynov, poet
 Lyubov Polishchuk, actress
 Grigory Potanin,  ethnographer and natural historian
 Ludmilla Radchenko, model and actress
 Vlada Roslyakova, model
 Robert Rozhdestvensky, poet
 Vissarion Shebalin, composer
 Valentina Talyzina, actress
 Mikhail Shivlyakov, Marine, Strongman 
 Tamāra Vilerte, Latvian chess player
 Mikhail Vrubel, artist
 Mikhail Ulyanov, actor
 Nikolai Yadrintsev, explorer and archaeologist

Athletes

 Egor Averin, ice hockey player
 Vladimir Barnashov, biathlete and biathlon coach
 Vitalina Batsarashkina, sports shooter
 Vera Biryukova, rhythmic gymnast
 Viktor Blinov, ice hockey player
 Tatiana Borodulina, speed skater
 Yegor Chinakhov, ice hockey player
 Ksenia Dudkina, rhythmic gymnast
 Dmitrij Jaskin, ice hockey player
 Sergei Kalinin, ice hockey player
 Yevgeniya Kanayeva, rhythmic gymnast, first and only twice olympic champion at individual rhythmic gymnastics competition
 Yuliya Kosenkova, middle-distance athlete
 Vera Krasnova, speed skater
 Ilya Mikheyev, ice hockey player
 Marat Mulashev, professional football
 Nikita Nikitin, ice hockey player
 Nikita Pivtsakin, ice hockey player
 Anastasija Reiberger, pole vaulter
 Dennis Siver, mixed martial arts fighter
 Yuri Shatalov, ice hockey player
 Alexander Shlemenko, mixed martial arts fighter
 Galima Shugurova, rhythmic gymnast
 Sofya Skomorokh, rhythmic gymnast
 Roman Sloudnov, swimmer
 Alexander Svitov, ice hockey player
 Dmitri Sychev, association football player
 Andrei Taratukhin, ice hockey player
 Irina Tchachina, rhythmic gymnast
 Aleksei Tishchenko, boxer
 Polina Tsurskaya, figure skater

Twin towns – sister cities

Omsk is twinned with:

 Antalya, Turkey
 Fuzhou, China
 Gomel, Belarus
 Hamrun, Malta
 Kaifeng, China
 Lublin, Poland
 Manzhouli, China
 Pavlodar, Kazakhstan
 Petropavl, Kazakhstan
 Púchov, Slovakia
 Ürümqi, China

See also

References

Notes

Sources

Further reading

External links

  
 Omsk Business Directory 
 

 
Akmolinsk Oblast (Russian Empire)
Populated places established in 1716
Populated places on the Irtysh River